Elections to the French National Assembly were held in Afars and Issas on 23 June 1968 as part of the wider French parliamentary elections. Moussa Ali Abdoulkader was re-elected as the territory's MP.

Results

References

Afars
1968 in Afars and Issas
Elections in Djibouti
June 1968 events in Africa